Neptune is the sixth studio album by Japanese singer Toshinobu Kubota, released on July 1, 1992. The album charted at number 3 on the Oricon Monthly Albums chart and remained on the charts for total of 13 weeks. The album sold a total of 484,000 units, reaching double platinum certification.

Track listing
 
 "To the Limit"
 "Adeus Meu Amor"
 
 
 
 "Let's Get a Groove: Yo! Hips"
 "Our Masterpiece"
 "Pump Up Your Gold"
 "Get Six"

Personnel
 Artwork (art direction & design): Ryuzoh Nagasex (Sony Records)
 Artwork (type setting): Art Press
 Co-producer: Andres Levin (tracks 1, 4, 10), Camus Celli (tracks 1, 4, 10), Jeff Bova (tracks: 9), Yoichiro Kakizaki (tracks 2, 3, 5 to 8, 11)
 Engineer: Stephen Seltzer
 Engineer (assistant): Jenni Bette, Shannon Carr
 Engineer (mastering): Ted Jensen
 Executive producer: Hidenori Taga (Kitty), Yasohachi "88" Itoh (Sony Records)
 Lyrics: Masumi Kawamura (tracks 2, 5), Toshinobu Kubota (tracks 1, 3, 4, 6 to 11)
 Mixing: Larry Alexander, Stephen Seltzer
 Music: Yoichiro Kakizaki (track 9)
 Photography: Yoshiaki Sugiyama
 Photography (digital): Foton
 Production, music: Toshinobu Kubota

Funkin' On Neptune Tour
Staged from June 26 to October 1, 1992, and included songs from the album Neptune, as well as the songs "Time (Shower ni Utarete)" and "Eien no Tsubasa" from his previous album Groovin'.

The opening act for the June 26 show was Yoshie Shimizu.

Set list
Let's Get a Groove: Yo! Hips
Natsu no Shigosen
To the Limit
Our Masterpiece
Eien no Tsubasa
Mayonaka no Taiyō
Time (Shower ni Utarete)

Personnel
Band
 Bass: Dale Sanders
 Guitar: Ichiro Haneda
 Keyboard: Yoichiro Kakizaki, Takuo Sugiyama
 Percussion: Obao Nakajima
 Other instruments: Hiroshi Araki, Kazufumi Suzuki

Background vocalists
 Dale Sanders
 Rinko Urashima
 Yoko Takahashi

References

1992 albums
Toshinobu Kubota albums
Sony Music albums